"Fight On Sioux" is a fight song of the University of North Dakota in Grand Forks, North Dakota.  Since the retiring of the Fighting Sioux nickname in 2012, it has been renamed to "U-N-D". Along with the new name, any references to Native American culture have been removed. For example, in the old version, one line stated "And as we go we'll show each foe that we're the toughest tribe between the poles". In the new version of the song, the word "tribe" has been replaced with the word "team".

Lyrics

Notes

External links
"Fight On Sioux" - und.edu

University of North Dakota
American college songs
College fight songs in the United States
Big Sky Conference fight songs
Songwriter unknown
Year of song missing